Polska Ludowa (People's Poland) was a semi-official reference to the Polish state under Communism. The term was intended to imply the power of the working people in the state. It was a colloquial reference, including official speeches, but was also sometimes used in official documents.

The official names of the state were:
Rzeczpospolita Polska (1944-1952) ( "Polish Commonwealth")
Polska Rzeczpospolita Ludowa (1952-1989), Polish People's Republic

References

Communism in Poland
Political catchphrases